Rahayu Supanggah (29 August 1949 – 10 November 2020) was an Indonesian composer.

Career
Supanggah was born in Boyolali, and composed more than 100 pieces, but was known mostly for his part in the international collaboration Realizing Rama and the music score composed for Robert Wilson's I La Galigo. His compositions for Opera Jawa won the Asian Film Award in 2007. From 2007 onward, he was resident artist at the Southbank Centre, London. He worked together with the eccentric composer Slamet Abdul Sjukur. He died in Surakarta, aged 71.

References

External links 
Southbank Centre biography
 

1949 births
2020 deaths
Indonesian composers
People from Boyolali Regency
Male composers
20th-century composers
20th-century male musicians
21st-century composers
21st-century male musicians